Shuangfeng County is a county in Hunan Province, China, it is under the administration of Loudi prefecture-level City.

Located on the east central part of the province, it is adjacent to the southeast of the city proper of Loudi. The county is bordered to the north and northeast by Xiangxiang City, to the southeast by Xiangtan and Hengshan Counties, to the south by Hengyang County, to the southwest by Shaodong County, to the northwest by Lianyuan City and Louxing District. The county has 12 towns and 3 townships under its jurisdiction, the county seat is Yongfeng.

History
The county of Shuangfeng was formed from the south western portion of Xiangxiang County in January 1952, named after the Shuangfeng Mountain. At its establishment, it was a county of Yiyang Prefecture, it was transferred to Shaoyang Prefecture in December 1952. Lianyuan Prefecture was formed from a portion of Shaoyang Prefecture in September 1977, it became a county of Lianyuan Prefecture. The prefecture of Lianyuan was renamed to Loudi in 1982, the prefecture of Loudi was reorganized as the prefecture-level city of Loudi, the county of Shuangfeng is under the administration of Loudi City.

Shexingshan Town was transferred to Louxing District on January 24, 2017. It has 12 towns and 3 townships under jurisdiction.

Climate

Subdivisions
Shexingshan Town was transferred to Louxing District on January 24, 2017. It has 12 towns and townships.

12 towns
 Gantang
 Heye
 Hongshandian
 Huamen
 Jingzi
 Qingshuping
 Santangpu
 Suoshi
 Xingzipu
 Yongfeng
 Zimenqiao
 Zoumajie

3 townships
 Shatang
 Shiniu
 Yintang

Education
 Shuangfeng County No. 1 High School

Tourism
Shuangfeng County is home to the Former Residence of Zeng Guofan.

Notable people
 Deng Qidong, geologist.
 Ge Jianhao, scientist. 
 Jiang Wan, politician.
 Qiu Jin, revolutionist. 
 Tang Qunying, revolutionist. 
 Wang Caozhi, revolutionist.
 Xiang Jingyu, revolutionist.
 Zeng Guofan, statesman, military general, and Confucian scholar of the late Qing dynasty.

External links 
 Official website

References
www.xzqh.org 

 
County-level divisions of Hunan